Down in There is an album by American folk singer/guitarist Greg Brown, released in 1990.

Reception

Writing for Allmusic, music critic Jason Ankeny wrote of the album "... Brown proves himself an able songwriter as well as a singer... While the majority of the album's songs are ballads leaning toward spare folk and country, "Poor Backslider" fits snugly into a Southern rock groove, while "If I Had Known" lopes along like an old rockabilly shuffle; all serve Brown's broken-in baritone wonderfully."

Track listing
All songs by Greg Brown
 "If I Had Known" – 3:23
 "Hillbilly Girl" – 4:15
 "A Little Place in the Country" – 5:45
 "Worrisome Years" – 4:08
 "Hacklebarney Tune" – 3:56
 "Poor Backslider" – 4:08
 "Fooled Me Once" – 6:13
 "Band of Gold" – 4:01
 "All Day Rain" – 3:22
 "You Are a Flower" – 3:42

Personnel
Greg Brown – vocals, guitar
Bo Ramsey – guitar, background vocals
Bill Cagley – banjo
Al Murphy – fiddle
Radoslav Lorković – piano, accordion
Angus Foster – bass
Steve Hayes – drums
Shawn Colvin – background vocals

Production
Produced by Bo Ramsey and Greg Brown
Engineered by Tom Tucker
Mixed by John Scherf
Photography by Marc Moberg
Design by Linda Beauvais

References

Greg Brown (folk musician) albums
1990 albums
Red House Records albums